Szeptycki (in Polish spelling; or  (Sheptytsky) in Ukrainian spelling) was a major noble family in Ruthenia (Polish–Lithuanian Commonwealth, later Austria-Hungary, Poland and Ukraine). They used the Szeptycki coat of arms. The family was related to a number of other noble families, such as the Wiśniowiecki family, the Ledóchowski family and the Fredro family.

The family history dates to the 15th century in the Ruthenian Voivodeship of the Polish–Lithuanian Commonwealth, with a document from 1469, issued by King of Poland, Casimir Jagiellon, confirming the family's right to Szeptyce (today Sheptychi, Ukraine). Originally Eastern Orthodox, some time after 1596 the family joined the Greek Catholic Church following the Union of Brest. From the 16th century, the family's members started to acquire important offices in the Polish–Lithuanian Commonwealth, including ecclesiastical, with several advancing to the rank of a bishop in the Greek Catholic Church (bishop Barlaam Szeptycki (d. 1715) was originally a bishop of the Eastern Orthodox rite, before converting to the Greek rite; other Greek rite bishops in the family included Atanazy Antoni Szeptycki (d. 1746), Atanazy Andrzej Szeptycki (d.1779) and Leon Ludwik Szeptycki (d. 1779).). In 1772 the family received the count title from the Holy Roman Empire. Around that time some members of the increasingly polonized family also converted to the Roman Catholic faith, and one member of the family became a Roman Catholic bishop (Hieronim Szeptycki, d. 1773). Notable 20th-century members included the Austro-Hungarian and then Polish general Stanisław Szeptycki, and Ukrainian monk and blessed Klymentiy Sheptytsky and Metropolitan Archbishop Andrey Sheptytsky.

The family continues to be active, and has created a foundation (Fundacja Rodu Szeptyckich) in modern Poland.

References

Further reading

External links

Fundacja Rodu Szeptyckich

 
Polish noble families
Ruthenian noble families